Felice Antonio Monaco (1611 – January 1667) was a Roman Catholic prelate who served as Bishop of Martirano (1661–1667).

Biography
Felice Antonio Monaco was born in Cosenza, Italy in 1611. On 21 November 1661, he was appointed during the papacy of Pope Gregory XIII as Bishop of Martirano. On 30 November 1661, he was consecrated bishop by Giulio Cesare Sacchetti, Cardinal-Bishop of Sabina, with Ottaviano Carafa, Titular Archbishop of Patrae, and Emilio Bonaventura Altieri, Bishop of Camerino, serving as co-consecrators. He served as Bishop of Martirano until his death in January 1667.

References

External links and additional sources
 (for Chronology of Bishops) 
 (for Chronology of Bishops)  

17th-century Italian Roman Catholic bishops
Bishops appointed by Pope Gregory XIII
1611 births
1667 deaths